Lisa Kosglow (born 18 October 1973) is an American snowboarder, born in New York City. She competed in women's giant slalom at the 1998 Winter Olympics in Nagano, and in women's parallel giant slalom at the 2002 Winter Olympics in Salt Lake City.

References

External links

1973 births
Living people
American female snowboarders
Olympic snowboarders of the United States
Snowboarders at the 1998 Winter Olympics
Snowboarders at the 2002 Winter Olympics
21st-century American women